Hamilton Village Historic District is a national historic district located at Hamilton in Madison County, New York.  The district contains 155 contributing buildings and one contributing site.  Most of the buildings are residential, but the district also includes commercial structures, churches and public buildings.  The centerpiece is the Village park, laid out in 1822.  Located within the district are the separately listed Adon Smith House and U.S. Post Office building.

It was added to the National Register of Historic Places in 1984.

References

Historic districts on the National Register of Historic Places in New York (state)
Georgian architecture in New York (state)
Federal architecture in New York (state)
Historic districts in Madison County, New York
National Register of Historic Places in Madison County, New York